Matthew Bell is the name of:
 Matthew Bell (cricketer) (born 1977), New Zealand international cricketer
 Matthew Bell (footballer) (born 1992), British Virgin Islands international footballer
 Matthew Bell (rugby league) (born 1983), Australian professional rugby league player
 Matthew Bell (British politician) (1793–1871), British Member of Parliament
 Matthew Bell (Indiana politician) (born 1974), American politician from the state of Indiana

See also
Mathew Bell (1769–1849), seigneur, businessman and political figure in Lower Canada
Matt Bell (disambiguation)